Polskie Radio Program III (Polish Radio Three), known also as Radiowa Trójka or shortly Trójka is a radio channel broadcast by the Polish public broadcaster, Polskie Radio. It is a music station playing a wide variety of music from rock, alternative, jazz and others. It is broadcast on FM, via satellite and online. The studios are located at Myśliwiecka Street 3/5/7 in Warsaw.

From 2015, the stations most known DJ's started to resign from the network or were fired (including Artur Orzech, Artur Andrus, Robert Kantereit, Dariusz Rosiak, Anna Gacek and Wojciech Mann). In May 2020 the station suffered a major transformation - after the visit of Jarosław Kaczyński, chairman of the Polish ruling party Prawo i Sprawiedliwosc to the grave of Smolensk air disaster victims (all cemeteries were then closed due to COVID-19 pandemics) became known to the public, a song relating to the events (with the catchline "Your pain is better than mine") debuted on the first place of the Lista Przebojów, winning this music chart. The next day Polish Radio made a statement that the results were fabricated. The statement received highly negative comments from many politicians (both opposition and the ruling party) and artists, as the list had existed since 1983 and most of the list staff had been working in Polish Radio since as early as 1978.

The accusations of fabrication resulted in resignations first of the Music Chart team, and later of almost all Trójka journalists. This followed by airing many hours of music without hosts (normally, the station plays music without hosts for only two hours a year, during Christmas Eve Wigilia supper). Some of the journalist from the team decided to come back to the station after one of them became the Trójka director, but they left the station again after he was removed from this position in August (after three months in office). Polish Radio then assembled a new team for the station, which included a few journalists that decided to stay and many coming from other media outlets, including some right-wing commentators. The new team of Trójka resulted in a huge drop of listenership, from around 8% to less than 2% of the market.

Former Trójka journalists now work at Radio 357 and Radio Nowy Świat.

See also
Trojka (disambiguation)

References

External links

Polskie Radio
Radio stations established in 1962